The ruling family of the Qara Qoyunlu descended from the Yıwa tribe of the Oghuz Turks, specifically, the Baharlu tribe. They ruled over present-day Iran, Iraq, Azerbaijan and eastern Turkey.

Qara Qoyunlu rulers

Yellow Shaded row signifies Progenitor of Qara Qoyunlu dynasty.
Pink Shaded row signifies Qara Qoyunlu rulers under Timurid vassalage.

References

Kara
Qara Qoyunlu rulers